Mohammed Al-Nahedh (born 3 August 1987) is a Saudi Arabian footballer who plays for Al-Riyadh as a goalkeeper.

Honours
Al-Ittihad
King Cup: 2013
Crown Prince Cup: 2016–17

Al-Batin
MS League: 2019–20

References

External links
 

Living people
1987 births
Saudi Arabian footballers
Association football goalkeepers
Al-Tai FC players
Ittihad FC players
Al-Faisaly FC players
Al-Qaisumah FC players
Al Batin FC players
Al-Riyadh SC players
Saudi First Division League players
Saudi Professional League players